Jeremias Felbinger (27 April 1616 – c. 1690) was a German Socinian writer, teacher, and lexicographer.

Felbinger was born in Brzeg.  He taught in Koszalin, Helmstadt, Bernstadt auf dem Eigen, Greifswald, and Wrocław, and lived at a "Strasswitz" near Gdańsk.

He corresponded with John Biddle (Unitarian) e.g. 1654. Like many Socinian exiles in Amsterdam he appears to have died there in poverty.

Works 
Felbinger's most significant works are perhaps his translation of the Remonstrant edition of the Greek New Testament into German, his Greek-German Lexicon of the New Testament, and his "Christian Handbook". A comprehensive list of works is given by Christopher Sand in Bibliotheca Anti-Trinitariorum.

 1648 Nomenclatura Latino-Germana
 1646 Rhetorica
 1646 Politicae Christianae  Dutch 1660
 1653 Demonstrationes Christianae
 1651 Christliches Handbüchlein. Dutch: Christelyke Handboeksken 1675. English translation Christian Handbook 1975.
 1657 Greek-German Lexicon of the New Testament.
 1660 German New Testament, translation from the Greek edition of "Stephani Curcellaei" 1655 i.e. of Étienne de Courcelles (Curcellaeus) (1586–1659) the French translator of Grotius.
 1675 Doctrina Syllogistica

References 

1616 births
1690 deaths
17th-century lexicographers
People from Brzeg
German Unitarians
17th-century German educators
German lexicographers
Translators of the Bible into German
German male non-fiction writers
17th-century German translators
Greek–German translators